Rudolf Morgenthaler (22 March 1926 – 2014) was a Swiss long-distance runner. He competed in the marathon at the 1952 Summer Olympics.

References

1926 births
2014 deaths
Athletes (track and field) at the 1952 Summer Olympics
Swiss male long-distance runners
Swiss male marathon runners
Olympic athletes of Switzerland
Place of birth missing